Bluebeard's Ten Honeymoons is a 1960 British thriller film directed by W. Lee Wilder and starring George Sanders, Corinne Calvet, and Jean Kent. The story is loosely based on that of the real-life serial killer Henri Désiré Landru.

It was shot at Elstree Studios near London and on location in Paris. The film's sets were designed by the art director Paul Sheriff.

Plot
Art dealer Henri Landru becomes infatuated with burlesque performer, Odette, who already has a lover and is only interested in Landru for money. She tricks Landru into thinking her mother is sick and needs money for an important operation. Landru vows to raise the money to fund the operation.

Landru attempts to find furniture that he can sell. He meets a young widow, Vivienne, who is hoping to sell some vintage furniture. He quickly charms Vivienne but when he later discovers she has sold her furniture to somebody else they quarrel, resulting in Vivienne's accidental death. Landru is able to cover up the manslaughter, but when he is able to easily claim Vivienne's furniture as his own and sell it he realises he has found an easy way to make money. Landru adopts several aliases and charms several wealthy, middle-aged women one by one, wooing them into marriage before killing them, usually by drugging them and then stabbing them.

Landru later sees Odette with her lover and realises she has been stringing him along the entire time. He lures her to his villa where he murders her.

Vivienne's sister has become suspicious over her disappearance but the police cannot help her without any evidence. She sets out to find Landru, eventually finding him at his rented villa. The police arrive and arrest Landru. The film ends with Landru's execution.

Cast
 George Sanders as Henri Landru
 Corinne Calvet as Odette  
 Jean Kent as Julienne Guillin  
 Patricia Roc as Vivienne Dueaux 
 Greta Gynt as Jeanette 
 Maxine Audley as Cynthia 
 Ingrid Hafner as Giselle
 Peter Illing as Lefevre  
 George Coulouris as Lacoste
 Sheldon Lawrence as Pepi  
 Paul Whitsun-Jones as Station Master
 Keith Pyott as Estate Agent
 Jack Melford as Concierge
 Robert Rietty as Bank Clerk
 Mark Singleton as Advertising Clerk
 Ian Fleming as Lawyer

References

External links

1960 films
1960s thriller films
British thriller films
Films directed by W. Lee Wilder
British serial killer films
Cultural depictions of Henri Désiré Landru
Films set in Paris
Films shot in Paris
Films shot at Associated British Studios
Allied Artists films
1960s serial killer films
1960s English-language films
1960s British films